"Surfing on a Rocket" is a song by French electronic music duo Air from their third studio album, Talkie Walkie (2004). It was released on 9 August 2004 as the album's second single and features additional vocals by singer Lisa Papineau. In the United States, "Surfing on a Rocket" was released as an EP on 19 October 2004. The track also appears on the soundtrack to the football video game FIFA Football 2005. The accompanying music video was directed by Antoine Bardou-Jacquet and Romain Guillon.

Track listings
French CD maxi single
"Surfing on a Rocket" (edit) – 2:41
"Surfing on a Rocket" (remixed by Zongamin) – 3:27
"Surfing on a Rocket" (remixed by Juan MacLean) – 7:01
"Surfing on a Rocket" (Tel Aviv Rocket Surfing Remake – remixed by Nomo Heroes) – 5:21
"Surfing on a Rocket" (To the Smiling Sun Remix – remixed by Joakim) – 6:31

French 12-inch single #1
A1. "Surfing on a Rocket" (album version) – 3:42
A2. "Surfing on a Rocket" (To the Smiling Sun Remix – remixed by Joakim) – 6:31
B1. "Surfing on a Rocket" (remixed by Juan MacLean) – 7:01
B2. "Surfing on a Rocket" (Tel Aviv Rocket Surfing Remake – remixed by Nomo Heroes) – 5:21

French 12-inch single #2
A. "Surfing on a Rocket" (Joakim remix) – 6:31
B1. "Surfing on a Rocket" (Juan MacLean remix) – 7:01
B2. Surfing on a Rocket" (original mix) – 3:42

French DVD single
"Surfing on a Rocket" (music video) – 3:42
"Cherry Blossom Girl" (music video – director's cut) – 3:50
"Surfing on a Rocket" (remixed by Zongamin) (audio) – 3:27
"Easy Going Woman" (audio) – 4:31
"Sex Born Poison" (demo) (audio) – 3:11

UK 12-inch single
A1. "Surfing on a Rocket" (album version) – 3:42
A2. "Surfing on a Rocket" (remixed by Juan MacLean) – 7:01
B1. "Surfing on a Rocket" (To the Smiling Sun Remix – remixed by Joakim) – 6:31
B2. "Surfing on a Rocket" (remixed by Zongamin) – 3:27
B3. "Surfing on a Rocket" (Tel Aviv Rocket Surfing Remake – remixed by Nomo Heroes) – 5:21

French 7-inch single
A. "Surfing on a Rocket" (edit) – 2:41
B. "Surfing on a Rocket" (remixed by Zongamin) – 3:27

US EP
"Surfing on a Rocket" (Tel Aviv Rocket Surfing Remake – remixed by Nomo Heroes) – 5:21
"Alpha Beta Gaga" (Mark Ronson Vocal Mix) (featuring Rhymefest) – 4:37
"Easy Going Woman" (previously unreleased) – 4:31
"Surfing on a Rocket" (remixed by Juan MacLean) – 7:01
"Alpha Beta Gaga" (Jackson remix) – 4:21
"Surfing on a Rocket" (To the Smiling Sun Remix – remixed by Joakim) – 6:31
"Alpha Beta Gaga" (Mark Ronson Instrumental Mix) – 3:10

Charts

Release history

References

2004 EPs
2004 singles
2004 songs
Air (French band) songs
Astralwerks EPs
Song recordings produced by Nigel Godrich
Virgin Records singles
Songs written by Nicolas Godin
Songs written by Jean-Benoît Dunckel